Jason Eric Roberts is an American musician, activist, urban advocate and co-founder of the Dallas, Texas, organization Bike Friendly Oak Cliff. He is a songwriter and performer in Dallas-based indie pop band The Happy Bullets. He also co-founded the Oak Cliff non-profit art collaborative The Art Conspiracy, and indie record label Undeniable Records.

Roberts has a day job as a senior IT consultant, and has contributed feature and news stories for Entertainment Weekly, the Pittsburgh Post-Gazette, the Detroit Metro Times, the Dallas Observer, and D Magazine's Best of Dallas series. He leads the Oak Cliff Chamber of Commerce Alternate Transportation committee, whose main project is coordinating a comprehensive multi-modal transit plan for the area.

Bike Friendly Oak Cliff, or BFOC, is a group of Dallas bicycle advocates, who promote creating better cycling facilities and infrastructure in the Oak Cliff section of South Dallas. Through Roberts efforts, the project has inspired other Dallas communities to create their own similar organizations.

References 

American indie pop musicians
American male songwriters
American activists
Living people
Place of birth missing (living people)
Year of birth missing (living people)